Peter Strickland may refer to:

Pete Strickland (born 1957), American basketball coach
Peter Strickland (director) (born 1973), British filmmaker
Peter Strickland (British Army officer) (1869–1951), World War One infantry general
Peter Strickland (music executive), American music executive
 Pete Strickland, a character portrayed by Shea Whigham in the HBO television series Perry Mason